Donetskyi is an urban-type settlement in Luhansk Oblast of eastern Ukraine, at about 50 km WNW from the centre of Luhansk city, on the right bank of the Luhan. Population: 

It is part of the Kirovsk Municipality.

References

Urban-type settlements in Alchevsk Raion